is a Japanese model and actor, known for his portrayal as Naki in Kamen Rider Zero-One and Shima Nishina in Kiss Him, Not Me. He started his modeling career as an exclusive model for the magazine Pichi Lemon and later became one of the standout models of Japan's genderless fashion subculture.

Nakayama initially came out as non-binary in 2019, but he later came out as a transgender man in 2021.

Career

In 2011, at age 12, Nakayama became an exclusive model for the magazine Pichi Lemon. After seeing photos of Korean model Kaito on a fashion brand website, Nakayama was inspired by their androgynous appearance and began to wear more androgynous clothing, becoming an influential figure for women in Japan's genderless fashion subculture.

In 2018, Nakayama made his first television acting appearance in the live-action television adaptation of Chūgakusei Nikki. He later made his film debut in Nunuko no Seisen: Harajuku Story, playing Akihisa Kubo, frontman for the fictional band ORION. In 2019, He played the role of Kaoru in the Y!mobile webseries Parallel School Days, which later gained a theatrical release. In 2020, He appeared in Kamen Rider Zero-One and its direct-to-Blu-ray spin-off series, Project Thouser, as Naki, a character confirmed by producer Takahito Omori to be genderless.

Nakayama was slated to star in the 2020 theatre adaptation of All About J as Rita Barthelme; however, due to the COVID-19 pandemic, the production was cancelled.

Nakayama is a brand ambassador for unisex clothing brand BLAKICHY and a partner of its sister brand KINGLYMASK. In 2019, he started his own fashion line, Xspada.

Personal life

In 2019, Nakayama came out as asexual and non-binary on his blog as well as in an interview with Vogue Girl, expressing his desire not to be defined as either male or female. In August 2021, he came out as a transgender man.

Filmography

Television

Film

References

External links
 

1998 births
People from Tokyo
Actors from Tokyo
Japanese LGBT actors
Japanese transgender people
Living people
Transgender men
Transgender models
Transgender male actors
Japanese actors
Asexual men